Iva Susan Greenwald is an American biologist who is Professor of Cell and Molecular Biology at Columbia University. She studies cell-cell interactions and cell fate specification in C. elegans. She is particularly interested in LIN-12/Notch proteins, which is the receptor of one of the major signalling systems that determines the fate of cells.

Early life and education 
Greenwald joined MIT as a graduate student in 1977. She was trained in the classics of molecular biology and developmental genetics. That year, H. Robert Horvitz joined the faculty at MIT, and convinced her to investigate C. elegans. She started working on genetics, functional redundancy cell-lineage mutants. She moved to the MRC Laboratory of Molecular Biology in 1983 where she worked alongside Jonathan Hodgkin, Gary Ruvkun and Victor Ambros, who encouraged her to try to clone LIN-12. It took her two years to develop a strategy to clone LIN-12 (Tc1 transposon tagging), and she identified that that genetic sequence contained epidermal growth factor (EGF) motifs. These investigations were amongst the first to show that worm developmental genes could be cloned, and that aspects of these genes were homologous to human proteins.

Research and career 
In 1986, Greenwald joined the faculty at Princeton University. She moved to Columbia University in 1993, and was made professor two years later. Greenwald dedicated her career to understanding the mechanisms that underpin the LIN-12/Notch signalling system.  LIN-12/Notch proteins mediate cell-cell interactions. Amongst these processes, Greenwald studies the role of LIN-12/Notich in binary regulation, feedback mechanisms and signal transduction. She has identified new genes that are involved with the modulation of LIN-12/Notch in development and disease.

Awards and honors 
 1983 Jane Coffin Childs Memorial Fund Postdoctoral Fellow
 1986 NIH Postdoctoral Fellow
 1987 Searle Scholar
 1988 DuPont Young Faculty Award
 1994 Howard Hughes Medical Institute Investigator
 1998 Metropolitan Life Foundation Promising Investigator Award
 2005 Elected to the American Academy of Arts and Sciences
 2005 Elected to the U.S. National Academy of Sciences
 2012 Ellison Medical Research Foundation Senior Scholar Award

Selected publications

Personal life 
Greenwald is married to Gary Struhl, with whom she has a daughter.

References 

 

American women biologists
Living people
Year of birth missing (living people)
Massachusetts Institute of Technology alumni
Fellows of the American Academy of Arts and Sciences
Members of the United States National Academy of Sciences
Columbia University faculty
21st-century American women